Amphirrhox is a genus of flowering plants belonging to the family Violaceae.

Its native range is Costa Rica to Southern Tropical America.

Species:

Amphirrhox grandifolia 
Amphirrhox longifolia

References

Violaceae
Malpighiales genera